Uhana is a town in the Ampara District, Eastern Province of Sri Lanka. 

The town is located on the Ampara-Oya road (A27). Uhana Maha Vidyalaya has situated in here.

Education

Government Schools 

 Uhana Maha Vidyalaya
 Uhana Kanishta Vidyalaya
 Uhana Thissapura Vidyalaya
 Udayagiri Vidyalaya

International Schools 

 Global Life International School - Uhana

References 
 

Towns in Ampara District
Uhana DS Division